Ursus Bus is a Polish bus, coach, trolleybus manufacturer based in Lublin, Poland. The company was founded in 2015 by URSUS S.A. and AMZ-KUTNO S.A.

Products

Current electric models
 Ursus Ekovolt - low-floor 12m electric city bus
 Ursus City Smile 8.5E - low-floor 8,5m electric city bus
 Ursus City Smile 10E - low-floor 10m electric city bus
 Ursus City Smile 12E - low-floor 12m electric city bus
 Ursus City Smile 18E - low-floor 18m electric city bus

Current Diesel models
 Ursus City Smile 10M LF - low-floor 10m city bus
 Ursus City Smile 12M LF - low-floor 12m city bus

Trolleybuses
 Ursus T70116 - low-floor 12,50m trolleybus

See also 

 Autosan
 Electric bus
 Electric vehicle conversion
 Hispano Carrocera
 Solaris Bus & Coach
 Ursus Factory

References

External links
 Official website

Bus manufacturers of Poland
Hybrid electric bus manufacturers
Electric bus manufacturers
Trolleybus manufacturers
Vehicle manufacturing companies established in 2001
Polish brands
Electric vehicle manufacturers of Poland